Girl Walk // All Day is a 2011 feature-length dance music video directed by Jacob Krupnick.

The film, which stars Anne Marsen as "The Girl", Dai Omiya as "The Gentleman", and John Clayton Doyle as "The Creep", follows a day in the life of the Girl as she dances through New York City. Girl Walk // All Day is set to Girl Talk's 2010 album, All Day.

The cost of producing Girl Walk // All Day was crowdfunded through Kickstarter. The film, which was released in 12 parts (corresponding with the 12 tracks of All Day) over the course of November and December 2011, has been the subject of multiple articles on the blog Gothamist, the website of The Atlantic and has been the subject of articles in The Wall Street Journal and The New York Times. 

Keith Uhlich of Time Out New York named Girl Walk // All Day the seventh-best film of 2012, calling it "exhilarating."

References

Dance music films
Culture of New York City
Kickstarter-funded films